Luis González (born 19 November 1945) is a Costa Rican archer. He competed in the men's individual event at the 1976 Summer Olympics.

References

1945 births
Living people
Costa Rican male archers
Olympic archers of Costa Rica
Archers at the 1976 Summer Olympics
Sportspeople from San José, Costa Rica